The 1996–97 North Carolina Tar Heels men's basketball team represented the University of North Carolina at Chapel Hill during the 1996–97 NCAA Division I men's basketball season. The team was led by head coach Dean Smith in his 36th and final season at the school. The team played its home games in the Dean Smith Center in Chapel Hill, North Carolina, as a member of the Atlantic Coast Conference.

Roster

Schedule and results

|-
!colspan=6 style="background:#56A0D3; color:#FFFFFF;"| Regular season

|-
!colspan=6 style="background:#56A0D3; color:#FFFFFF;"| ACC tournament

|-
!colspan=6 style="background:#56A0D3; color:#FFFFFF;"| NCAA tournament

Rankings

References 

North Carolina Tar Heels men's basketball seasons
North Carolina
North Carolina
NCAA Division I men's basketball tournament Final Four seasons